Kachhalā (Nepal Bhasa: कछला) is the first month in the Nepal Era calendar, the national lunar calendar of Nepal. The month corresponds to Kārtik in the Hindu lunar calendar and roughly matches November in the Gregorian calendar.

Kachhalā begins with the new moon and the full moon falls on the 15th of the lunar month. The month is divided into the bright and dark fortnights which are known as Kachhalā Thwa (कछला थ्व) and Kachhalā Gā (कछला गा) respectively.

The most important festival that occurs during this month is Tihar (Swanti). The first day of the bright fortnight of Kachhalā is New Year's Day when Newars observe Mha Puja, an auspicious ceremony to invoke good fortune during the coming year.

The full moon Kārtik Purnimā is also a major religious holiday. In Nepal Mandala, the day is celebrated as Saki Milā Punhi (सकि मिला पुन्हि) or Saki Manā Punhi (सकि मना पुन्हि). Sacred paintings known as Halimali, which are made of popcorn, wheat and black soybeans, are displayed in front of temples to mark the end of the month-long hymn singing season. The special food of the day is boiled arum and sweet potato.

Days in the month

Months of the year

References

Months
Nepali calendar
Nepalese culture